Vouéboufla is a town in central Ivory Coast. It is a sub-prefecture of Zuénoula Department in Marahoué Region, Sassandra-Marahoué District.

Vouéboufla was a commune until March 2012, when it became one of 1126 communes nationwide that were abolished.

In 2014, the population of the sub-prefecture of Vouéboufla was 20,454.

Villages
The 15 villages of the sub-prefecture of Vouéboufla and their population in 2014 are:

Notes

Sub-prefectures of Marahoué
Former communes of Ivory Coast